is a Japanese light novel series written by Shachi Sogano and illustrated by Shikidouji. It was serialized online from 2011 to 2019 on the user-generated novel publishing website Shōsetsuka ni Narō. It was later acquired by Shufunotomo, who have published twelve volumes since December 2012 under their Hero Bunko imprint. A manga adaptation with art by Issei Hyōju has been serialized in Kadokawa Shoten's shōnen manga magazine Monthly Shōnen Ace since April 2017. It has been collected in eight tankōbon volumes. An anime television series adaptation produced by Passione aired from July to September 2022.

Characters

Michio is a human who abruptly finds himself displaced into the setting of a cheap online fantasy game. His cheat abilities in the game include analyzing everything around him, enabling him to assess their strengths and weaknesses. With a perceptive mind and his skills in kendo, he is able to hold his own in this new, dangerous environment.

Roxanne is a wolfkin who becomes Michio's first slave and party member. They first met when Michio purchased Roxanne from her owner.

Sherry is a dwarf who becomes Michio's second  slave and party member. Due to her thin ears, which makes her looks older, she was cheaper to buy. Sherry is exceptionally intelligent and frequently asked more direct or probing questions than Roxanne.

Miria is a catkin who becomes Michio's third slave and party member. Her obsession with fish led her to becoming a slave as she stole some from a sacred pond. Miria is still learning the magical language in the books, and communicates through Roxanne. 

Vesta is a dragonkin who becomes Michio's fourth slave and party member. Vesta has been a slave her entire life due to her parents being slaves themselves.

Rutina is an elf who becomes Michio's fifth slave and party member. She is a former noble who was forced into slavery.

Allen is a slave merchant in Vale. Having a friendly personality, he treats his slaves well and ensures they find good homes.

Media

Light novel

Manga
A manga adaptation illustrated by Issei Hyōju began serialization in Kadokawa Shoten's Monthly Shōnen Ace on April 26, 2017.

Anime
An anime television series adaptation was announced on December 10, 2020. It was produced by Passione and directed by Naoyuki Tatsuwa, with scripts written by Kurasumi Sunayama, character designs handled by Makoto Uno, and music composed by Tomoki Kikuya. The series aired from July 6 to September 21, 2022, on AT-X and other networks. The opening theme song "Oath" was performed by Shiori Mikami, while the ending theme song  was performed by Taku Yashiro and Kenta Miyake. Crunchyroll has licensed the series. An original video animation is bundled with the series' first Blu-ray and DVD box sets, which were released on November 25, 2022. Another OVA was released with the series' second Blu-ray and DVD box sets on December 23, 2022.

Episode list

Notes

References

External links
 at Shōsetsuka ni Narō 
 
 
 

2012 Japanese novels
Anime and manga based on light novels
AT-X (TV network) original programming
Censored television series
Crunchyroll anime
Harem anime and manga
Isekai anime and manga
Isekai novels and light novels
Kadokawa Shoten manga
Light novels
Light novels first published online
Novels about slavery
Passione (company)
Shōnen manga
Shōsetsuka ni Narō